Chiddes may refer to:

Chiddes, Nièvre, a commune in the French region of Bourgogne
Chiddes, Saône-et-Loire a commune in the French region of Bourgogne